Senda F is a Bolivian town belonging to the municipality of Chimoré, located in the Carrasco Province of the Department of Cochabamba.

Geography
Senda F is located in the North Department of Cochabamba in  (16.874372, -65.132312). It is bordered to the south by the Arroyo Negro river.

Demographics

2012 census

As of the 2012 Bolivian census, there were 1500 people, 171 households, and 154 families residing in the town.

References

Instituto Nacional de Estadistica de Bolivia

External links 

 Map of the Carrasco Province
 Population data and map of Chimoré Municipality

 Instituto Nacional de Estadistica de Bolivia

Populated places in Cochabamba Department